The 1992 European Tour, titled as the 1992 Volvo Tour for sponsorship reasons, was the 21st official season of golf tournaments known as the PGA European Tour.

The European Tour ventured to East Asia for the first time, with the addition of the Johnnie Walker Asian Classic in Thailand to the tour schedule.

The season was made up of 38 tournaments counting for the Order of Merit, and five non-counting "Approved Special Events".

The Order of Merit was won by England's Nick Faldo for the second time; he previously won the title in 1983. Faldo won four official-money tournaments during the season, including The Open Championship, and also added victories in two approved special events.

Changes for 1992
There were several changes from the previous season, with the return of the Dubai Desert Classic, the Tenerife Open and the Moroccan Open; the addition of the Johnnie Walker Asian Classic, the Turespaña Masters Open de Andalucía, the Roma Masters, the Lyon Open V33 and the Honda Open; and the loss of the Girona Open, the Murphy's Cup, the European Pro-Celebrity and the Epson Grand Prix of Europe.

Schedule
The following table lists official events during the 1992 season.

Unofficial events
The following events were sanctioned by the European Tour, but did not carry official money, nor were wins official.

Order of Merit
The Order of Merit was titled as the Volvo Order of Merit and was based on prize money won during the season, calculated in Pound sterling.

Awards

See also
List of golfers with most European Tour wins

Notes

References

External links
1992 season results on the PGA European Tour website
1992 Order of Merit on the PGA European Tour website

European Tour seasons
European Tour